Feels Good to Me is the 1978 debut solo album by former Yes and King Crimson drummer Bill Bruford. The band Bruford grew out of the line-up assembled for this album. The album features guitarist Allan Holdsworth, bassist Jeff Berlin, keyboardist Dave Stewart, and ECM stalwart Kenny Wheeler on fluegelhorn. Bruford also enlisted singer-songwriter Annette Peacock (who performs two of Bruford's lyrics, and contributes one of her own) and Brand X guitarist John Goodsall (who plays rhythm on the title track only). Dave Stewart was a pivotal figure in the music of the Canterbury scene with groups like Egg, Hatfield and the North and National Health, but despite his strong playing (and co-writing) presence, the album does not sound much like the Canterbury bands, and is instead closer to contemporaries Brand X (whose keyboardist Robin Lumley co-produced the album with Bill Bruford).

Reception

In a retrospective review for AllMusic, Thom Jurek praised the way the performers handled the material, and opined that "Bruford has yet to issue a solo recording as powerful as Feels Good to Me."

The authors of The Penguin Guide to Jazz Recordings stated: "The combination of Kenny Wheeler and Annette Peacock gives Feels Good to Me an obvious cachet, but it's Bruford's torrential drumming with its ringing snare drum sound that makes the record special."

John Kelman of All About Jazz called the album "a landmark recording" due to "the sheer chemistry between the core members," and noted that "the kind of compositional depth and maturity of Feels Good to Me came completely out of left field." He commented: "what is so refreshing about Feels Good to Me is its complete lack of compromise; there's no question that this is the album Bruford wanted to make, and it weathers the test of time incredibly well."

Writing for Progrography, Dave Connolly remarked: "Of the solo Bruford albums, this is the best... Bruford the band is as unique here as the people in it."

Exposé Online's Jon Davis wrote: "These musicians were presenting a completely new way of blending jazz and rock that didn't sound like any of the previous 'fusion' groups... Every single track on the album brings something new to the table... the combination of these players at this moment in time is simply magical."

Track listing

Personnel 
 Bill Bruford – drums, percussion
 Allan Holdsworth – electric guitar
 Dave Stewart – keyboards
 Jeff Berlin – bass
with
 Kenny Wheeler – flugelhorn (on tracks 3, 7, 9)
 Annette Peacock – lead vocals (2, 3, 10)
 John Goodsall – rhythm guitar (6)
 John Clark – electric guitar ("Joe Frazier" live)

Production
 Produced by Robin Lumley & Bill Bruford
 Tape operators: John Brand, Colin Green, Stephen Short
 Engineer: Stephen W Tayler
 Equipment technicians: Peter Revill, Mick Rossi

References

External links 
 Feels Good to Me at discogs

Bill Bruford albums
1978 debut albums
E.G. Records albums
Albums recorded at Trident Studios